William Bannister (1879 – 25 March 1942) was an English professional footballer who played as a defender for Burnley, Bolton Wanderers, Woolwich Arsenal and Leicester Fosse. Bannister also played at international level, earning two caps with the English national side between 1901 and 1902.

Biography
William Bannister was born in Burnley, Lancashire in early 1879. As a teenager, he worked as a coal miner at the Barden Colliery before moving into professional football. After his football career ended, Bannister resided in Leicester and owned a public house in the city. He died on 25 March 1942, at the age of 63.

International career
Following his performances for Burnley, Bannister was called up to the England national football team in 1901. He made his international debut on 18 March 1901 in the 6–0 victory over Wales at St James' Park. Bannister was again selected for the national side the following year, while playing for Bolton. His second and final international cap came against Ireland on 22 March 1902.

References

1879 births
1942 deaths
English footballers
England international footballers
Burnley F.C. players
Bolton Wanderers F.C. players
Arsenal F.C. players
Leicester City F.C. players
English Football League players
Footballers from Burnley
English Football League representative players
Association football defenders